Edward Lloyd Jones (23 April 1874 – 2 February 1934) was an Australian Shorthorn cattle breeder and chairman of David Jones Limited. David Jones was founded in Sydney in 1838 and is the world's oldest continuously operating department store still trading under its original name.

Early life

Edward Lloyd Jones was born in Sydney, the fourth of six children of Edward Lloyd Jones and grandson of David Jones founder of the department store bearing his name. He was the older brother of Sir Charles Lloyd Jones. He was educated at Newington College from 1885 until 1887, then at All Saints College, Bathurst, and from October 1889 at Sydney Grammar School, although no leaving date is recorded in Grammar's register.

David Jones

At eighteen years of age, Jones journeyed to England and entered the London office of David Jones. On his return to Australia he gained pastoral and cattle experience in the Burnett district of Queensland. He re-entered the family business upon the death of his father in the train disaster at Redfern, New South Wales in 1894. David Jones was then a private company but in 1906 it became a limited liability company. Jones then became chairman of directors, a position he held until he resigned in 1920. From 1906 until 1910 Jones and his family lived at Halsbury, 12–14 Albyn Road, Strathfield, a large two-storey Federation style house designed by architects Slatyer and Cosh in 1898.

Cattle breeder
From 1921, Jones devoted his attention to the breeding of beef Shorthorn cattle at Hambledon Hill, Singleton, New South Wales where in 1915, he had established a cattle stud. His Shorthorns won many prizes at the Sydney Royal Easter Show and Royal Melbourne Show, and at important country shows. He was president of the Beef Shorthorn Society of New South Wales for some time, and at his death was a vice-president. Jones was also president of the Northern Agricultural Association. Subsequently, he acquired a property at Tarcutta where he lived at the time of his death.

Family and death
Jones married his cousin, Miss Jane Mander Jones, the daughter of Sir Philip Sydney Jones, in 1897. They had two sons and two daughters. In 1911, after the death of his first wife, he married her younger sister, Miss Sarah Ruby Jones, who survived him on his death. There was a son and a daughter by his second marriage. His three sons (Edward, Charles, and David Owen Lloyd Jones ), and three daughters, all survived him. Jones had come to Sydney from his cattle station at Tarcutta to see his mother before her death at Strathfield, on the Saturday before he died. He was cremated at Rookwood Cemetery, following a service at Trinity Congregational Church, Strathfield, which was built by his family and designed by his cousin, George Sydney Jones.

References

1874 births
1934 deaths
People from Sydney
People educated at Newington College
Australian businesspeople in retailing
Australian Congregationalists